Christian Alphonso McClean is an English former professional footballer who played as a striker in the Football League for Bristol Rovers, Swansea City and Northampton Town.

Biography
Born in Colchester in Essex in 1963, McClean turned professional in 1987 after signing for Bristol Rovers from Essex non-League club Clacton Town. During his time at Rovers he played 51 league matches, scoring six goals. He also played at Wembley Stadium when Rovers reached the final of the Football League Trophy, losing 2–1 to Tranmere Rovers.

In 1991, he was transferred to Swansea City, but after making only four league appearances for the club, he moved to Northampton Town. In 1992, he returned to non-League football with Essex club Chelmsford City. He later played for Sudbury Town, scoring the goal that put them ahead against Brentford in the club's first appearance in the second round of the FA Cup.

A popular player with Bristol Rovers supporters, he continues to regularly attend Rovers games. In May 2016 he was knocked unconscious in a hit-and-run attack in Marks Tey in Essex.

References

1963 births
Sportspeople from Colchester
English footballers
F.C. Clacton players
Bristol Rovers F.C. players
Swansea City A.F.C. players
Northampton Town F.C. players
Chelmsford City F.C. players
Sudbury Town F.C. players
Heybridge Swifts F.C. players
English Football League players
Living people
Association football forwards